Cyndi Buchheit-Courtway is an American politician serving as a Republican member of the Missouri House of Representatives, representing the state's 115th House district.

Career
Buchheit-Courtway graduated from St. Vincent de Paul High School (1994) and Jefferson County Community College (2018) and works in the healthcare industry in addition to her public office.

Electoral History

Personal life
Buchheit-Courtway is a Christian.

References

Living people
21st-century American politicians
Republican Party members of the Missouri House of Representatives
Women state legislators in Missouri
21st-century American women politicians
1976 births